Stricker's Grove is a family owned amusement park located in Ross, Ohio, USA. Unlike other amusement parks, Stricker's Grove is closed to the public for most of the year. Instead, it is rented out for private functions, such as weddings. The park is open to the public for 8 days of every year, on July 4, 4 days in mid July for the Hamilton County 4-H Community Fair, the second Sunday in August (Family Day), Labor Day, and a Sunday in October called "Customer Appreciation Day".

History
The Stricker's lived in a house on the property. Henry  Stricker initially used the land for a place for coworkers to come to on weekends to picnic and enjoy the countryside. A dance hall was later added, and was designed so that if the park failed, it could be converted into a chicken coop. 

In the 1940s, a pony cart ride was added along with a horse and pony track. The first rides arrived at the park in 1954, including the Boat Ride and the Rockets, both of which remain in operation.

Upon Henry's death in 1960, the park was passed on to his three sons, Harold, Elmer, and Ralph. In 1972, the park was relocated to Ross, Ohio and Ralph became the sole owner.  Ralph died in January 2007.  His daughter Debbie and three longtime employees now operate the park.

Rides and attractions
Stricker's Grove currently has several amusement rides, including two "classic" wooden roller coasters.

Tornado

The larger of the roller coasters is Tornado, designed by Al Collins and built by Ralph Stricker. The ride started construction in 1990 and opened in 1993. The ride runs a single Philadelphia Toboggan Coasters train. The Tornado is a mirror image of the former John C. Allen designed Jet Coaster (later known as the Mighty Lightnin' and the Comet) at the now defunct Rocky Glen Park in Moosic, Pennsylvania.
it goes 45 miles per hour.

Teddy Bear

The Teddy Bear wooden roller coaster is a small family sized ride first built in 1996, also by Ralph Stricker. Like the Tornado, the Teddy Bear coaster was built using the blueprints from the 1935 built Teddy Bear at Coney Island in Cincinnati, Ohio. The coaster has been recognized as an ACE Classic Coaster.

Other attractions
 Boat Ride
 Rockets
 Little Cars
 Kiddie Whip
 Kiddie Turtles (a kiddie-sized Tumble Bug)
 Carousel
 Train ride
 Ferris wheel
 Tilt-A-Whirl
 Scrambler
 Flying Scooters
 Electric Rainbow (Round Up)
 Miniature golf
 Pirate ship
 Elephants
 Tip Top

Former rides 

 Kiddie Coaster (a 13 foot tall purple kiddie coaster)
 Crazy Daisy (a Philadelphia Toboggan Company miniature "Cuddle-Up" ride)
 Helicopters
 Topsy Turvy
 Freefall

Pictures

References

External links
[http://www.strickersgrove.com/ Official Stricker's G

Amusement parks in Ohio
Buildings and structures in Butler County, Ohio
Tourist attractions in Butler County, Ohio
1924 establishments in Ohio
Amusement parks opened in 1924
Family-owned companies of the United States